Nenad Gagro (born 27 September 1975) is a Bosnian professional football manager and former player who is currently working as an assistant coach of the Bosnia and Herzegovina national team.

Managerial statistics

Honours

Player
Široki Brijeg
Bosnian Premier League: 2003–04

References

External links
Nenad Gagro at footballdatabase.eu

1975 births
Living people
Sportspeople from Mostar
Croats of Bosnia and Herzegovina
Association football defenders
Bosnia and Herzegovina footballers
NK Široki Brijeg players
FC Saturn Ramenskoye players
FK Sarajevo players
HŠK Zrinjski Mostar players
Premier League of Bosnia and Herzegovina players
Russian Premier League players
Bosnia and Herzegovina expatriate footballers
Expatriate footballers in Russia
Bosnia and Herzegovina expatriate sportspeople in Russia
Bosnia and Herzegovina football managers
NK GOŠK Gabela managers
HŠK Zrinjski managers
Premier League of Bosnia and Herzegovina managers